Praxagoras of Athens was a pagan historian in the early 4th century AD.

He was born in Athens and wrote three historical works, which are all lost: a history of the Kings of Athens, a history of Alexander the Great, and a panegyric biography of the emperor Constantine. A few fragments of the biography of Constantine are preserved in the Bibliotheca of Photius (cod. 62).

Dindorf's 1870 Minor Greek Historians Praxagoras' fragments start on page 438.

Bibliography 
 Andrea Basile: Propaganda costantiniana e cultura ellenica in Prassagora di Atene, dissert. Università Cattolica del Sacro Cuore, Milano 1990/91.
 Pawel Janiszewski: The Missing Link. Greek Pagan Historiography in the Second Half of the Third Century and in the Fourth Century AD., Warsaw 2006.

Late-Roman-era pagans
4th-century Byzantine historians
Late Antique writers
4th-century Romans
Ancient Athenian historians